Mickle Trafford is a village and former civil parish, now in the parish of Mickle Trafford and District, in the unitary authority of Cheshire West and Chester and the ceremonial county of Cheshire, England.  It includes the area known as Plemstall. The A56 road from Chester to Warrington passes through the village and the Chester-Warrington railway line passes immediately to its east. The civil parish was abolished in 2015 to form Mickle Trafford and District, part of it also went to Guilden Sutton.

At the 2011 census the population of the civil parish was 1,822.  In 2004 it had been estimated to be 2,140, although the 2001 census recorded 1,831 people.

History
The name is derived from the Old Norse word mikill (meaning big or great) and the Old English words trog (a trough) and ford.

The only artifacts found from the prehistoric period are an arrowhead and a worked flake which were found in the nearby settlement of Hoole Village.  The arrowhead is dated from the Early Bronze to the Early Iron Age (2350 BC to 701 BC).  The Roman road from Chester to Wilderspool (near the present town of Warrington) passed through or near the village.  It is likely that the road known as The Street, which passes to the northwest of the village, was the route of the Roman road.  Finds of Roman coins, jewellery and pottery have been found in the village and nearby.  There is also evidence of Roman practice camps in the nearby settlements of Hoole Village and Picton.  Mickle Trafford is not mentioned in the Anglo-Saxon Chronicle, but a raised area in a marsh by the River Gowy to the northeast of the present village, was known as the "Isle of Chester".  Here lived a hermit called Plegmund, who was later to become the Archbishop of Canterbury, and the area is now known as Plemstall, which means "Plegmund's holy place".

Formerly a township in Plemstall Parish, Broxton Hundred, the population was 247 in 1801, 303 in 1851, 268 in 1901 and 348 in 1951.

The village was previously served by two railway stations: Mickle Trafford and Mickle Trafford East. Although the stations have been demolished, both lines remain operational.

Landmarks and places of interest
St Peter's Church, Plemstall is located to the northeast of the village and is a Grade I listed building  On the lane leading to the church is St Plegmund's well.  Other buildings in and around the village are listed at Grade II.  To the north of the village is Trafford Mill.  The other buildings are Mickle Trafford Manor, Windsor Lodge, Ivy Bank Farmhouse, and a farm building associated with Ivy Bank Farmhouse.

See also

Listed buildings in Mickle Trafford

References
Citations

Sources

External links

Village website

Villages in Cheshire
Former civil parishes in Cheshire
Cheshire West and Chester